Group A of the 2013 FIFA Confederations Cup took place from 15 to 22 June 2013 in Belo Horizonte's Mineirão, Brasília's Mané Garrincha, Fortaleza's Castelão, Recife's Arena Pernambuco, Rio de Janeiro's, Maracanã and Salvador's Arena Fonte Nova. The group consisted of host nation and defending champions Brazil, Italy, Japan, and Mexico.

Teams

Notes

Standings

In the semi-finals:
 The winners of Group A, Brazil, advanced to play the runners-up of Group B, Uruguay.
 The runners-up of Group A, Italy, advanced to play the winners of Group B, Spain.

Matches

Brazil vs Japan

Mexico vs Italy

Brazil vs Mexico

Italy vs Japan

Italy vs Brazil

Japan vs Mexico

References

External links
Official site
Official Documents and Match Documents

Group A
Italy at the 2013 FIFA Confederations Cup
Brazil at the 2013 FIFA Confederations Cup